Dipterocarpus semivestitus is a species of tree in the family Dipterocarpaceae, occurring in Kalimantan and peninsular Malaysia. This tree is almost always found in lowland forest on swampy land. It is very close to extinction.

References

semivestitus
Trees of Borneo
Flora of Kalimantan
Flora of Peninsular Malaysia